Michael Heinz Skibbe (born 4 August 1965) is a German former football player and current manager of Japanese club Sanfrecce Hiroshima.

Club career
In his youth, Skibbe played for SG Wattenscheid 09, then moved to the professional team of FC Schalke 04. From 1985 to 1986, he appeared in 14 Bundesliga games, but tore his cruciate ligament three times, which ended his playing career.

Managerial career

1988–2004: Early career
At the age of 22, he started his career as coach with Schalke 04 youth team.

In 1989, Skibbe became a youth coach for Borussia Dortmund. Skibbe became head coach of the reserve side on 1 July 1997, where he won the Oberliga Westfalen, and head coach of the senior team on 1 July 1998. Skibbe becoming the youngest head coach in the Bundesliga of all time at the age of 32. Skibbe was sacked on 6 February 2000. Skibbe finished with a record of 28 wins, 20 draws, and 18 losses. Skibbe moved to the position of coordinator of the youth system of the club.

He gave up this post after being offered the position as director of the German national team. In 2000, he became its head coach. Rudi Völler, however, made most of the decisions, but did not have a coaching licence and thus couldn't be the official head coach. After Germany was eliminated in the first round of UEFA Euro 2004, Völler and Skibbe resigned from their positions. Skibbe was director of the youth system of the German Football Association from 24 August 2004 to 8 October 2005.

2005–08: Return to club management
Skibbe became head coach of Bayer Leverkusen on 8 October 2005. Skibbe was sacked from Bayer Leverkusen on 18 May 2008 after missing out on Europe. Skibbe finished with a record of 52 wins, 25 draws, and 45 losses.

2008–12: Going to Turkey and returning to the Bundesliga
On 11 June 2008 Skibbe agreed terms with the Turkish football club Galatasaray. He won the Turkish Super Cup after a 2–1 victory against Kayserispor. Galatasaray failed to qualify for the group stages of the UEFA Champions League after they lost 3–2 on aggregate to Steaua Bucuresti. Skibbe was sacked from Galatasaray on 23 February 2009, after a heavy 5–2 loss to Kocaelispor. Skibbe left Galatasaray fifth in the table, outside of a UEFA Champions League spot.

On 4 June 2009, Eintracht Frankfurt announced that Skibbe would succeed Friedhelm Funkel as head coach of the club. On 22 March 2011, after a decline in the Bundesliga, Skibbe was sacked by the club. Skibbe finished with a record of 25 wins, 15 draws, and 27 losses.

On 17 July 2011, Eskişehirspor announced that Skibbe would succeed Bülent Uygun as head coach of the club. On 27 December 2011, Skibbe's contract was dissolved to make way for his move to Hertha BSC. Skibbe finished with a record of nine wins, three draws, and five losses.

Skibbe was officially released from Eskişehirspor to make way for his Hertha BSC move on 27 December 2011. After five losses in five games with the team, Skibbe was sacked from Hertha BSC on 12 February 2012.

2012–15: Foreign club management positions
On 17 May 2012, he was formally introduced as the new manager of Karabükspor for 1+1 years. Skibbe left the club on 5 November 2012. Skibbe finished with a record of four wins, three draws, and five losses.

On 15 June 2013, Skibbe was appointed as the new manager of Grasshopper Club Zürich, succeeding Uli Forte. In January 2015, his contract was terminated by mutual consent. The club's management met thereby Skibbe's desire of realignment.

On 12 January 2015, it was reported that Skibbe had taken over Turkish Süper Lig side Eskişehirspor as the new manager. He had been coach of the club before in 2011 for six months.

2015–2018: Greece
On 29 October 2015, the Hellenic Football Federation hired him as the new head coach of the national team. He was hired as the successor of Sergio Markarián due to the team's unsuccessful qualification for UEFA Euro 2016. Skibbe's first ever game as Greece coach was on 13 November 2015 against Luxembourg in Differdange which ended in a shocking start with the Greeks losing 1–0 to the very low ranked home side. His second game in charge was a very intense 0-0 derby draw against their biggest local-rivals Turkey in Istanbul on 17 November 2015. His next and third game in charge of the country was on 24 March 2016 where Skibbe enjoyed his first ever victory of the national team since taking over in a 2–1 home win over Montenegro at the Georgios Karaiskakis Stadium in Piraeus with goals from Giorgos Tzavellas and Nikos Karelis. His next challenge was the newly talented Iceland where the Greeks after leading 2-0 went on to lose the game 3–2 to the Icelanders in Piraeus on 29 March 2016. On 4 June 2016, Skibbe's Greek side began their 2-game tour of Australia by losing the first game 1–0 with a late Aussie winner from Matthew Leckie at Stadium Australia in Sydney.

On 7 June 2016, Skibbe enjoyed only his second win as Greece coach in an emphatic display as the Greeks took out a 2–1 victory with a good finish by Petros Mantalos and an amazing 60 metre-strike from Giannis Maniatis inside his own half which beat the scrambling Australia goalkeeper Adam Federici all the way to bounce into the net at Docklands Stadium in Melbourne. It was Greece's first victory over the Australians since 1978 when Greece were 1–0 victors over the Aussies in Adelaide.
On 1 September 2016, he enjoyed a 2–1 away win over the Netherlands in an International friendly, the first ever Greek win on Dutch soil with goals from Kostas Mitroglou and Giannis Gianniotas. On 6 September 2016, Greece played against newly FIFA recognized minnow country Gibraltar who were appearing in their first FIFA competition game in their history and Skibbe's Greeks despite at one point the scores were level at 1–1, they went on to defeat the Gibraltarians 4–1 at Estádio Algarve in Faro/Loulé and get off the mark strong in their Round 1 2018 FIFA World Cup qualification group game. Greece have continued to be successful in their group, drawing 1–1 to a highly commendable Belgium squad on 25 March 2017.

Despite losing to the Belgians 1–2 at home some months later, subsequent positive results against Cyprus and Gibraltar helped Greece clinch a place in the World Cup qualification playoffs, being placed second to Belgium and just above Bosnia & Herzegovina. The team's playoff campaign against Croatia was rather disappointing due to a heavy 4–1 away defeat in the 1st leg at Maksimir Stadion, which also proved to be the aggregate score that got Greece eliminated, following a goalless draw in the return leg at Karaiskakis Stadium. Despite this outcome, the Hellenic Football Federation recognized Skibbe's contribution to restoring the national team's status within the footballing world after a devastating Euro 2016 qualifier campaign, and the increased cohesion and chemistry that he brought amongst the players during his reign. In fact, on 12 November 2017, Skibbe announced to the press that he would remain at the helm of Greece, something later confirmed by the Federation after the manager signed a two-year contract extension covering the UEFA Euro 2020 qualifiers. However, a poor showing in the first rounds of UEFA's newly formed Nations League competition, has prompted the Federation to consider sacking him. Skibbe's removal from his post as Greece manager was confirmed on 24 October 2018, with native experienced manager Angelos Anastasiadis expected to take charge for both the Nations League's two remaining games, and the Euro 2020 qualifiers.

Al-Ain
Skibbe became manager of Al-Ain on 17 October 2020. Skibbe's first match was a 1–0 loss to Al Hilal. 28 January 2021, Skibbe was sacked by Al-Ain. At the time of his sacking, Al-Ain sat at the bottom of the table, six points from safety.

Sanfrecce Hiroshima

Career statistics

Club

Managerial statistics

Honours

Manager
Borussia Dortmund U19
 A-Junioren Bundesliga: 1994–95, 1995–96, 1996–97

Borussia Dortmund II
 Oberliga Westfalen: 1997–98

Galatasaray
Turkish Super Cup: 2008

Sanfrecce Hiroshima
 J.League Cup: 2022
 J.League Manager of the Year: 2022

References

External links

 

1965 births
Living people
Sportspeople from Gelsenkirchen
German footballers
Germany youth international footballers
Bundesliga players
2. Bundesliga players
SG Wattenscheid 09 players
FC Schalke 04 players
German football managers
Bundesliga managers
Süper Lig managers
Borussia Dortmund managers
Bayer 04 Leverkusen managers
Eintracht Frankfurt managers
Galatasaray S.K. (football) managers
Eskişehirspor managers
Kardemir Karabükspor managers
Grasshopper Club Zürich managers
Expatriate football managers in Turkey
Expatriate football managers in Switzerland
German expatriate sportspeople in Turkey
German expatriate sportspeople in Switzerland
German expatriate football managers
Greece national football team managers
Expatriate football managers in Greece
German expatriate sportspeople in Greece
Association football midfielders
Borussia Dortmund II managers
Footballers from North Rhine-Westphalia
Borussia Dortmund non-playing staff
Association football coaches
Saudi Professional League managers
Expatriate football managers in Saudi Arabia
German expatriate sportspeople in Saudi Arabia
Al-Ain FC (Saudi Arabia) managers
J1 League managers
Sanfrecce Hiroshima managers